Wilbert "Bill" Hunt (22 Aug 1890 Connersville, Indiana – December 15, 1950 Wickenburg, Arizona) was an American racecar driver active during the formative years of the auto racing. Better known for running the Craig-Hunt engine manufacturing company, that also made racing and road parts. Later became an aviator and rancher, but remained close to engineering all his life. Despite numerous reports listing him as William, his first name was Wilbert.

Career statistics

By season

Indy 500 results

References

External links
 

Indianapolis 500 drivers
1890 births
1950 deaths
Racing drivers from Indianapolis
People from Wickenburg, Arizona
People from Connersville, Indiana
Sportspeople from the Phoenix metropolitan area